The R287 road is a regional road in Ireland linking Sligo and the R280 in County Leitrim.

From Sligo, the road goes south via Carraroe before turning east towards Lough Gill. The road follows the lake's southern shore past Dooney Rock and later enters County Leitrim. In Leitrim, the road passes near Dromahair before heading northeast to end at the R280.

See also
 Roads in Ireland

References

Regional roads in the Republic of Ireland
Roads in County Sligo
Roads in County Leitrim